Ofrenda (Offering) is a Puerto Rican Christmas music and Puerto Rican Folk Music album by Danny Rivera. This album was Danny Rivera's second Christmas album. As special guests he reunited legendary local folk group Trio Vegabajeño (Fernandito Alvarez, Benito de Jesús, Pepito Maduro and Jorge Hernandez). Jorge Hernandez was also a member of the group Alpha IV which had been recording with Danny for several years. From his previous album, Controversia he recruited singer Alma Galarza of Vicente Carattini y Los Cantores de San Juan with the condition she quit Los Cantores to join him on lead vocals full-time in the studio and on tour, which she did.  Jardinero de Cariños was the biggest hit from the album.

This album was dedicated to Joaquin Muriel.

Track listing

Musicians
 Danny Rivera - lead vocals
 Trio Vegabajeño
 Alma Galarza - lead vocals and chorus
 José Gonzalez - Puerto Rican cuatro and guitar
 Modesto Nieves - Puerto Rican cuatro and Venezuelan cuatro
 Javier Hernandez - keyboards and chorus
 Jorge Hernandez - Requinto
 Miguel Cubano - bass
 Alpha IV - chorus
 Alxa Ruiz, Jesús Cordero and Selma Berrios - chorus
 Julio Lugo - percussion

Production
 Musical arrangements: José Gonzalez
 Musical director: José Gonzalez
 Producers - Danny Rivera and Gladys Hernandez
 Recording engineers - Rei Peña and Javier Hernandez
 Mixing - Rei Peña, Javier Hernandez and Danny Rivera
 Album cover design - Heriberto Gonzalez
 Concept: José Gonzalez, Edwin Reyes and Danny Rivera
 Photos: Jochi Melero
 Coordinator: Catalino Figueroa
 Distribution - Alpha Records - DNA Records

External links 

1986 albums
Danny Rivera albums